Ralph M. Gambone is a former United States Navy officer. He served as Leader/Officer in Charge of the U.S. Navy Band from August 13, 1998 to March 2007.  Prior to that, he served as Director of the U.S. Naval Academy Band in Annapolis, Maryland.

Career
A native of Annapolis, Gambone enlisted in the Navy in 1969 after receiving his bachelor's degree in music from Towson State College (Maryland). He was first assigned to the U.S. Naval Academy Band as a clarinet instrumentalist and also served as conductor of the Midshipman Stage and Concert Bands.  While there he earned a master's degree in music from Catholic University in Washington, D.C.

After a tour of duty aboard the cruiser USS Little Rock (CLG 4), Gambone was assigned to the United States Navy Band in Washington, D.C. After three years with the Band and promotion to chief musician, he was assigned to the Bureau of Naval Personnel as Assistant Budget Manager for the Navy Music Program in 1978.

In 1981, he was commissioned an ensign and reported for duty as Music Program Liaison Officer for the Navy Chief of Information in The Pentagon.

After two years as Director, Navy Band San Diego, he was assigned as the United States Navy Band's Supply Officer in 1985, and a year later assumed the duties of the Band's Assistant Leader. From August 1988 to June 1990, he served as Director, SEVENTH Fleet Band, stationed on board the USS Blue Ridge (LCC 19) in Yokosuka, Japan, before returning to the United States Navy Band as Assistant Leader. His next assignment took him to the Armed Forces School of Music in Little Creek, Va., where he served first as Executive Officer from March to August 1994, then as Commanding Officer.

He was promoted to captain in October 2002, while serving as Director of the U.S. Navy Band.

Awards and honors
In April 2001, Gambone was inducted into the prestigious American Bandmasters Association (ABA), the professional association of master conductors and musicians. The ABA recognizes outstanding achievement in the field of concert bands and membership is considered the highest honor achievable by American bandsmen. In May 1991, he received the Distinguished Achievement Award in music from Towson State University.

His awards include the Meritorious Service Medal (two awards), Navy and Marine Corps Commendation Medal (two awards), Navy and Marine Corps Achievement Medal, Army Achievement Medal, Meritorious Unit Commendation (four awards) and others.

External links
Official biography, from the United States Navy Band website
USS Little Rock Association Website
USS Little Rock "Famous Crew"

United States Navy officers
American male conductors (music)
American clarinetists
Towson University alumni
People from Annapolis, Maryland
Living people
Catholic University of America alumni
Year of birth missing (living people)
Place of birth missing (living people)
21st-century American conductors (music)
21st-century clarinetists
21st-century American male musicians